The Society for Earthquake and Civil Engineering Dynamics (SECED) was founded in 1969 to promote the study and practice of earthquake engineering and structural dynamics, including blast, impact and other vibration problems. It also supports study of societal and economic ramifications of major earthquakes.

It is the British branch of both the International Association (IAEE) and the European Association of Earthquake Engineering (EAEE). It is an Associated Society of the Institution of Civil Engineers (ICE), and is sponsored by the Institution of Mechanical Engineers (IMechE), the Institution of Structural Engineers (IStructE) and the Geological Society.

SECED has organised conferences and lectures (see below). It hosted a 2002 European conference on earthquake engineering in London, and in July 2015 hosted a two-day conference at Homerton College, Cambridge titled Earthquake Risk and Engineering towards a Resilient World. It also organises regular meetings and has published a newsletter since 1987.

Mallet–Milne lectures
It organises the biennial Mallet–Milne Lecture, named after Robert Mallet and John Milne, regarded as the founding fathers of engineering seismology. The inaugural lecture was given at the ICE in London on 27 May 1987.

See also

 Named lectures

References

1969 establishments in the United Kingdom
Earthquake engineering
Civil engineering